Babhulwade, is a village in Parner taluka in Ahmednagar district of state of Maharashtra, India. It is a village located on intersection of Shirur–Kalyan (State Highway 51). It is famous about Swayambhu Shree Kedareshwar Temple.

Religion
The majority of the population in the village is Hindu.

Economy
The majority of the population has farming as their primary occupation.

Education
Jilha Parishad Prathamik School, Babhulwade
Shree Kedareshwar Vidyalay, Babhulwade

See also
 Parner taluka
 Villages in Parner taluka

References 

Villages in Parner taluka